Ronkini Gupta is a  hindustani classical vocalist and playback singer who won Saregamapa World Series reality show aired on Zee TV in 2004. She sang the critically acclaimed song "Rafu" in Tumhari Sulu (2017) for which she was nominated for Filmfare Award for Best Female Playback Singer. She sang two songs in the 2018 released film Sui Dhaaga for Anu Malik, "Chaav Laaga" with Papon and "Tu Hi Aham" which is her solo song in the film.  She is a Sangeet Visharad  and her singing repertoire covers Khyaal, Fusion and Bollywood. She has been recipient of many awards such as the Saregamapa World Series, Doverlane National Merit and Artist Aloud Award. She has performed with elan on many stages and has also travelled the world with the Indian broadway show "Bharati" as the lead vocalist. She composed in Mr Ya Miss (2005) and lent voice to Jai Maharashtra Dhaba Bhatinda (2013), Aankhon Dekhi (2014), Pyaar Vali Love Story (2014), Hrudyantar (2017), Taleem (2016), "Rafu" in Tumhari Sulu (2017), "Chaav Laaga" with Papon and "Tu Hi Aham" as a solo song in Sui Dhaaga. Both the songs in Sui Dhaaga received widespread acclaim and firmly established her as a noteworthy singer of her generation. She is widely known for her ability to superbly blend her classical training with contemporary musicality.

Career
Ronkini hails from Jamshedpur, the steel city of India. She participated in 2004 edition of Sa Re Ga Ma Pa world series (earlier Sa Re Ga Ma Pa), she became the winner of the contest jointly with Hrishikesh Ranade. Later, she composed two songs for the film Mr Ya Miss titled "Kanha"  for Sonu Nigam. her debut bollywood playback was for the highly acclaimed film Aankhon Dekhi (2014), directed by Rajat Kapoor . She sang " Rafu" for Vidya Balan in Tumhari Sulu (2017) for which she was nominated for Filmfare Award for Best Female Playback Singer.  She was nominated yet again in 2019 for Filmfare Award for Best Female Playback Singer for the  chartbuster song Chaav Laga from Sui Dhaaga.

She travels across the country with her solo recitals and has performed at various prestigious stages namely Sawai Gandharv Mahotsav (2022), Maharana Kumbha Sangeet Samaroh, Udaipur (2022), Pancham Nishad- Pratahswar(2021), Utsaah by Durga Jasraj (2021)Banyan Tree Festival- Barkha Ritu (2020), Kalaghoda Festival (2019), Melbourne Classical Arts Society Festival (2019), to name a few. She has released an independently produced Indian classical album titled Mere Kheyaal Se in 2020, where she has recorded four tracks in four different ragas, which are her own original bandishes, shot and recorded live. She is often quoted by the musical maestro AR Rahman in his list of favourite artists. 

Ronkini Gupta has a band called The Kheyaal-e-Jazz Projekt (Ronkini Gupta Collective) which is a classical fusion band. The band has won the Artist Aloud Music Awards for 2016 and 2018 and has also been featured on Kappa TV with their OSTs- Aye Ri Chandni, Khaare Se Naina and Jhoothi Batiyaan. She has also contributed additional vocals towards Coke Studio Season 4 with Sachin Jigar for the song "Laadki".

Training
A distinction holder - Sangeet Visharad from Gandharva Mahavidyalaya in Hindustani Classical, she has trained under, Shri Chandrakant Apte, an exponent of the Gwalior Gharana in her formative years (1990-2000). She has further honed her skills under Ustad Dilshad Khan (2000–01) Pt.Samaresh Chowdhary (2003–04) and Late Ustad Abdul Rashid Khan Sahab (2005-2007).

Winning her way through several inter school and inter state level competitions, she went on to win a National Level Merit (Hindustani Classical Vocal category) at the prestigious Doverlane Music Conference in Kolkata, in the year 2000 when she was only 16.

Discography

Composer

Playback singer

Awards

Other Awards

 2000: Doverlane Music Conference : All India Rank 4 in Indian Classical Vocal
 2004: SaReGaMaPa World Series (Zee TV)
 2018: NITIE Award for Recognition of Significant Contribution in the field of Singing

References

Indian women playback singers
Hindi-language singers
Bollywood playback singers
Indian film score composers
Indian women composers
Living people
People from Jamshedpur
Singers from Jharkhand
21st-century Indian singers
21st-century Indian women singers
Women musicians from Jharkhand
Year of birth missing (living people)